Chard is a surname. Notable people with the name include:
 Chester S. Chard (1915–2002), American anthropologist
 Danny Chard (born 1980), English cricketer
 Geoffrey Chard (born 1930), Australian opera singer 
 Herbert Chard (1869–1932), English cricketer 
 John Chard (1847–1897), commander of the British garrison at the Battle of Rorke's Drift
 Phil Chard (born 1960), English footballer
 William Chard (1812–1877), American pioneer

See also

Char (name)
Chara (given name)
 Chard Hayward (born 1949), Australian television actor
Chard Powers Smith (1894–1977), American writer
Charl (name)
Charo (name)